Moldova participated in the Junior Eurovision Song Contest 2011, with their entry selected through a non-televised national selection.

Before Junior Eurovision

National final
14 entries were submitted to TRM, which 5 were chosen to compete in the national final.

On 6 October 2011, the five entries were performed in front of a jury, which consisted of Geta Burlacu, Aura, Vitalie Rotaru, Sandu Gorgos and Vladimir Beleaev. Lerika was eventually selected as the Moldovan representative for the 2011 contest.

At Junior Eurovision

Voting

Notes

References

Junior Eurovision Song Contest
Moldova
Junior